Darband-e Sofla (also Romanized as Darband-e Soflá; also known as Darbandī-ye Soflá and Darband-e Pā’īn) is a village in Miankuh Rural District, Chapeshlu District, Dargaz County, Razavi Khorasan Province, Iran. At the 2006 census, its population was 280, in 96 families.

References 

Populated places in Dargaz County